Glastonbury Extravaganza (also known as Glastonbury Abbey Extravaganza and previously as Glastonbury Classical Extravaganza) is an annual music event held in the grounds of Glastonbury Abbey in Glastonbury, England since 1996. The event is held as a thank you to local people from Glastonbury Festival organiser Michael Eavis. 

The event started life as a classical music concert – expanding out to three days and moving into a mix of classical, pop and rock music. Since 2013 it has returned to a single Saturday night format, but retained a popular music theme. The current format of the event is that the grounds open at 16:30, a local choir opens the proceedings at around 17:00 followed by a number of acts leading up to the headliner, followed by a firework display to close the evening at around 22:00. People bring their own food and drink to set up picnics, or fetch take-away food from Glastonbury high street, a short walk away. Extravaganza is one of three events organised by Eavis each year. The other events are the major Glastonbury Festival and the small-scale Pilton Party, held in Pilton.

Performers

Withdrawals 
A number of artists have had to withdraw after the initial line-up was announced due to illness or scheduling conflicts.

Ticketing 

Vouchers for the event usually go on sale in the December of the year before the event. These are available from the Glastonbury Abbey shop (online and in person). The announcement of who will be performing is then made in early May and the tickets are available from July onwards. The vouchers can only be exchanged for that years event. In 2019 ticket prices were £40 adult and £25 for a child.

References

Music festivals in Somerset
Glastonbury